"'Zar je ljubav spala na to (Obećanja)"  (Has Love Come to That (Promises)) is a song by Croatian pop band Magazin featuring Bosnian rock singer Mladen Vojičić Tifa. It was written by Croatian songwriter and lyricist Vjekoslava Huljić and produced by Tonči Huljić. It was released as a single through Croatia Records in 2001. The song was well received by both of the singers' fanbases. Commercially, the song achieved success in Croatia and the wider Yugoslav region. A music video was released which features the band and both of the lead vocalists singing the song along with scenes from the 2000 movie What Women Want. It is watched 1.5 million times as of September 2022.

In 2022, Rozga re-released the song in an acoustic version featuring Croatian pop singer Matija Cvek for her fourth studio album and first acoustic album titled Minut Srca Mog (2022). The rework fared well on the Croatian airplay chart where it managed to peak at number 4 in the week of its release. A music video directed by Dario Radusion was also released on 15 September showing the duo singing the song together on the streets of Zagreb and in a studio. The acoustic rework was performed live at the singer's concerts during the Minut Srca Mog Tour (2022–23).

Background and live performances
In 2001, Jelena Rozga served as the main vocal of the famous pop band Magazin while Mladen Vojičić Tifa was the former member of the popular Yugoslav rock band Bijelo dugme. They collaborated on "Zar je ljubav spala na to" whose music was arranged by Tonči Huljić and whose lyrics were written by Vjekoslava Huljić. A music video for the single was also released. It shows Rozga singing the lyrics in front of a bridge and a factory, the rest of the band driving a vintage car and Tifa singing the song on rocks and in front of a factory. Excerpts and scenes from the movie What Women Want (2000) starring Mel Gibson are also interspersed in the clip. Towards the end, both Magazin and Tifa can be seen singing and accomapnied by instruments in a warehouse.

The group performed "Zar je ljubav spala na to" together with Tifa during a live televised appearance on Hrvatska radiotelevizija. On 26 April 2020, during a live online concert that Jelena Rozga released on her Instagram and YouTube channels during the COVID pandemic, she performed an acoustic version of "Zar je ljubav spala na to" accompanied by Milan Terze on guitar.

2022 rework

Background and reception
In August 2022, Rozga confirmed during interviews and on her Instagram account that her then-upcoming acoustic album would open with an acoustic rework of "Zar je ljubav spala na to" featuring Croatian pop vocalist Matija Cvek; a music video for the rework was also announced. Rozga's idea to collaborate with the singer came after she heard his cover of her single "Suze biserne" during his live concerts. During an interview, Cvek revealed that the collaboration was out of his "comfort zone", as it represents a different genre from his usual discography. The rework, produced by Srđan Sekulović – Skansi was released on 15 September 2022. 

Upon its release, the song was well received by the press who commended Cvek's vocals and demonstration of singing talent on the song. Fans were more divided in their response; while some felt that the duo's vocals worked well together, others felt it fell short to the original featuring Tifa. In October 2022, the song was nominated in the category Hit of September at the 2022 Cesarica Awards which it also won. In December 2022, the song was nominated in the category for Best Collaboration at the 2023 Music Awards in Serbia.

The song was included on the set list of the singer's regional Minut Srca Mog Tour (2022–23), where Cvek made a guest appearance at a concert of the tour held at the Zagreb Arena on 17 December 2022.

Music video
A music video directed by Dario Radusin was released on 15 September 2022 on the singer's official YouTube channel. The photography for the clip was finalized by Petar Vilović, while the singer's makeup and styling were made by Saša Joković, Mijo Majhen and Envy Room. In the visuals, the two singers can be seen walking on the streets of Zagreb as well as lip-syncing to the lyrics in artful settings. Critics and the press dubbed the clip "intimate" as the two singers are seen exchanging "affectionate looks and touches" with each other. Within a week of its release, the video garnered 400.000 views and it appeared on the third position of trending videos on YouTube in Croatia. As of November 2022, the video has been watched over 1 million times on the platform.

Charts
The single featuring Matija Cvek was commercially successful on the HR Top 40, the country's airplay chart, where it debuted and peaked at number four for the week ending 29 August 2022. The following week, it moved to the fourteenth position on the same chart. It has spent a total of 11 weeks on the chart, most of them in the top 20, as of week ending 7 November 2022.

Credits and personnel
Credits are taken from the video description of the official music video for "Zar je ljubav spala na to" on YouTube.
Tonči Huljić – music
Vjekoslava Huljić – lyrics
Srđan Sekulović Skansi – arrangement and production
Davor Petrović – guitar
Mario Ferin – piano
Ivica Ciban – bass guitar
Nebojša Škrgić – drums
Ivana Čabraja – backing vocals

References

External links
 

Croatian songs
2001 songs
2001 singles
2022 songs
2022 singles
Songs written by Vjekoslava Huljić
Song recordings produced by Tonči Huljić